Leah Kennedy is an  English netball player who has played for  Team Northumbria and Sirens Netball in the  Netball Superleague.

In 2016, Kennedy made her debut as well as earned her first test cap for England against Northern Ireland at the Netball Europe championship. She also participated at the Fast5 Netball World Series in Melbourne, Australia later that year.

References

1993 births
Living people
English netball players
Netball Superleague players
Team Northumbria netball players
Sirens Netball players